Philip S. W. Goldson International Airport  is an airport that serves the nation of Belize's largest city, Belize City along the eastern coast of Central America. It was named after politician Philip S. W. Goldson, who died in 2001. The airport is about 30 minutes drive from Belize City's centre, in Ladyville. For this reason, Belize's capital has been moved to Belmopan, but the airport remains the largest and busiest in the country. With stable passenger growth, Philip S. W. Goldson International Airport is currently the fifth busiest airport in Central America.

History
Originally known as Belize International Airport, the airport was renamed in honor of Philip S. W. Goldson on 7 February 1988.

Military use

Due to the Belizean–Guatemalan territorial dispute, Philip S. W. Goldson International Airport has hosted several military units over the years since its construction. In 1984, a senior US Air Force General stated that it was "the best defended airfield in Central America". Most notable residents have been Headquarters British Forces Belize, No. 1417 (Tactical Ground Attack) Flight RAF operating Harrier jump jets, No. 1563 (Helicopter support) Flight RAF, resident Anti-Aircraft Squadrons of the RAF Regiment, resident helicopter units of the Army Air Corps, HarDet Belize, Butcher Radar and Belize Defence Forces, among others. Price Barracks is a military installation located just north of the airport, which was formerly known as Airport Camp, the headquarters  of British Forces Belize.

Historical airline service

In 1950, TACA Airlines (which is now Avianca Honduras) was operating weekly nonstop flights to New Orleans and San Salvador as well as weekly direct one stop service to Managua with Douglas DC-4 propliners.  TACA subsequently began operating Vickers Viscount turboprops on a weekly southbound service flying a routing of New Orleans - Belize City - Guatemala City - San Salvador - Tegucigalpa - Managua - San Jose, Costa Rica - Panama City, Panama.   In 1953, British West Indian Airways (BWIA, which is now Caribbean Airlines) in association with British Overseas Airways Corporation (BOAC, which is now British Airways) was operating one flight a week to Belize from Kingston, Jamaica via an intermediate stop in Grand Cayman with a Vickers VC.1 Viking twin-prop aircraft with this flight offering connecting service via Kingston from a BOAC flight that operated a routing from London, England via stops in New York City, Nassau, Bahamas and Montego Bay, Jamaica. BWIA in conjunction with BOAC would later operate weekly nonstop service between the airport and Kingston with Vickers Viscount turboprop aircraft.  Thirty years later in 1983, four airlines were operating jet service into the airport according to the Official Airline Guide (OAG) including Air Florida with nonstop Boeing 737-200 flights from Miami and San Pedro Sula, Servicio Aereo de Honduras (SAHSA) with nonstop Boeing 727-100 flights from Houston (via Houston Intercontinental Airport), New Orleans and San Pedro Sula, TACA Airlines International with nonstop Boeing 737-200 and British Aircraft Corporation BAC One-Eleven flights from Houston (via Houston Intercontinental Airport), Miami, New Orleans and San Salvador, and Transportes Aereos Nacionales (TAN Airlines) with nonstop Boeing 737-200 flights from Miami and San Pedro Sula while local air carrier Maya Airways was operating domestic service in Belize with Britten-Norman Islander twin-prop aircraft.  Also according to the OAG, by 1989 TACA had introduced wide body Boeing 767-200 nonstop service to Miami in addition to its Boeing 737-200 flights with other service to Miami at this time being operated by Eastern Airlines with Boeing 727-200s as well as TAN with Boeing 737-200s.

Belize Airways Ltd. was a scheduled passenger airline based at the airport which operated flights to Miami, San Pedro Sula, San Salvador and La Ceiba with Boeing 720 and stretched British Aircraft Corporation BAC One-Eleven series 500 jetliners operated at various times during its existence from 1977 to 1980 according to its timetables.

Airlines and destinations

Passenger

Cargo

Statistics

Future plans
Philip S. W. Goldson International Airport will have integrated access with proposed Belize City Central Railway Station.

References

External links
 
 Official website

Airports in Belize
Belize District
Belize Rural Central